North Macedonia participated in the Eurovision Song Contest 2022 in Turin, Italy, with the song "Circles" performed by Andrea. The North Macedonian broadcaster Macedonian Radio Television (MRT) organised the national final  2022 in order to select the North Macedonian entry for the 2022 contest. Six entries competed in the national final and "Circles" performed by Andrea was announced as the winner on 4 February 2022 following the combination of votes from a five-member international jury panel and a public vote.

North Macedonia was drawn to compete in the second semi-final of the Eurovision Song Contest which took place on 12 May 2022. Performing during the show in position 11, "Circles" was not announced among the top 10 entries of the second semi-final and therefore did not qualify to compete in the final. It was later revealed that North Macedonia placed eleventh out of the 18 participating countries in the semi-final with 76 points.

Background

Prior to the 2022 contest, North Macedonia had participated in the Eurovision Song Contest twenty times since its first entry in  under the provisional appellation "former Yugoslav Republic of Macedonia", abbreviated "FYR Macedonia".

The North Macedonian national broadcaster, Macedonian Radio Television (MRT), broadcasts the event within North Macedonia and organises the selection process for the nation's entry. MRT confirmed their intentions to participate at the 2022 Eurovision Song Contest on 20 October 2021. Between 2008 and 2011, North Macedonia selected their entries using the national final . During this period, the nation failed to qualify to the final on every occasion. After failing to qualify in 2015 where  was used as a national final, the broadcaster internally selected the nation's entry between 2016 and 2021, resulting in a single qualification to the final during this period in 2019. For 2022, the broadcaster returned to using a national final to select the North Macedonian entry.

Before Eurovision

Za Evrosong 2022 
 2022 was a song contest organised by MRT that served as North Macedonia's national final to select their entry for the Eurovision Song Contest 2022. Six entries participated in the competition which consisted of two shows on 28 January 2022 and 4 February 2022. Both shows took place during the MRT 1 programme , hosted by Aleksandra Jovanovska and 2017 Macedonian Eurovision representative Jana Burčeska.

Competing entries 
A submission period was opened for interested artists and composers to submit their songs between 10 December 2021 and 16 January 2022. MRT received 47 submissions at the closing of the deadline and six entries were selected by a seven-member committee consisting of Meri Popova (MRT 1), Zoran Mirčevski (MR 2), Biljana Nikolovska (MR 1), Aleksandra Jovanovska (MR 2), Jana Burčeska (MRT 3), Maja Trpčanovska (MRT 1) and Ardita Imeri (MRT 2). The six competing artists and songs were announced on 4 February 2022.

Final 
The six competing entries were presented to the public during the first show on 28 January 2022 and the public was able to vote online on the broadcaster's official Eurovision Song Contest website evrovizija.mrt.com.mk until 4 February 2022. A 50/50 combination of the online vote and a five-member international jury panel selected "Circles" performed by Andrea as the winner, which was announced during the second show on 4 February. The international jury panel consisted of Gordon Bonello (Maltese TV producer and journalist), Tali Eshkoli (music critique and Head of Delegation for ), Natia Mshvenieradze (TV producer and Head of Delegation for ), Felix Bergsson (writer, actor and Head of Delegation for ) and David Tserunyan (TV producer and Head of Delegation for ). A monetary prize of €2,000 was also awarded to the winner. In addition to the announcement of the winner, the show featured guest appearances by 2019 Macedonian Eurovision representative Tamara Todevska and 2021 Macedonian Junior Eurovision representative Dajte Muzika.

Preparation 
On 5 February, MRT announced that "Circles" would undergo a production revamp for the Eurovision Song Contest as a part of the €2,000 budget allocated by the broadcaster. The official music video for the song was released on 10 March via the official Eurovision Song Contest's YouTube channel.

Promotion 
Andrea made several appearances across Europe to specifically promote "Circles" as the North Macedonian Eurovision entry. On 4 March, Andrea appeared during the presentation show of the 2022 Montenegrin Eurovision entry, . On 5 March, Andrea presented the revamped version of "Circles" for the first time during the final of the Romanian Eurovision national final. On 3 April, Andrea performed during the London Eurovision Party, which was held at the Hard Rock Hotel in London, United Kingdom and hosted by Paddy O'Connell and SuRie. On 7 April, Andrea performed during the Israel Calling event held at the Menora Mivtachim Arena in Tel Aviv, Israel. On 16 April, Andrea performed during the PrePartyES 2022 event which was held at the Sala La Riviera venue in Madrid, Spain and hosted by Ruth Lorenzo.

At Eurovision 

According to Eurovision rules, all nations with the exceptions of the host country and the "Big Five" (France, Germany, Italy, Spain and the United Kingdom) are required to qualify from one of two semi-finals in order to compete for the final. The top ten countries from each semi-final progress to the final. The European Broadcasting Union (EBU) split up the competing countries into six different pots based on voting patterns from previous contests, with countries with favourable voting histories put into the same pot. On 25 January 2022, an allocation draw was held which placed each country into one of the two semi-finals, as well as which half of the show they would perform in. North Macedonia was placed into the second semi-final, to be held on 12 May 2022, and was scheduled to perform in the second half of the show.

Once all the competing songs for the 2022 contest had been released, the running order for the semi-finals was decided by the shows' producers rather than through another draw, so that similar songs were not placed next to each other.

The two semi-finals and final were broadcast in North Macedonia on MRT 1 and MRT 2 with commentary by Eli Tanaskovska. The North Macedonian spokesperson, who announced the top 12-point score awarded by the North Macedonian jury during the final, was Jana Burčeska, who previously represented North Macedonia at the contest in 2017.

Flag Incident 
During the "Turquoise Carpet" event which preceded the Opening Ceremony of the contest on 8 May 2022, Andrea was seen throwing the flag of North Macedonia onto the floor during a photoshoot with the press. MRT later published a statement condemning her action, describing it as "desecration of a national symbol, which is punishable by Macedonian law". The broadcaster also threatened to withdraw Andrea from the contest. Andrea immediately issued a statement on national television, apologising for her actions and stating that she simply meant to hand the flag to a member of the delegation, who was too far away. MRT later stated on 11 May that they would take all disciplinary measures after the delegation returns from Turin, while also raising the possibility that they would not return for the 2023 contest due to the negative publicity caused by the incident.

Semi-final
Andrea took part in technical rehearsals on 3 and 6 May, followed by dress rehearsals on 11 and 12 May. This included the jury show on 11 May where the professional juries of each country watched and voted on the competing entries.

The Macedonian performance featured Andrea performing alone on stage in a black silk-lined coat with a crop top and black leather boots. The stage colours were predominately gold with the background LED screens displaying sun patterns and the LED floor displaying a spiral effect involving pieces whirling around in a circle towards the climax of the performance. Panels towards the front of the stage were also used which displayed handprints. Andrea was also joined by two off-stage backing vocalists:  and Ana Petanovska.

At the end of the show, North Macedonia was not announced among the top 10 entries in the second semi-final and therefore failed to qualify to compete in the final. It was later revealed that North Macedonia placed eleventh in the semi-final, receiving a total of 76 points: 20 points from the televoting and 56 points from the juries.

Voting 

Below is a breakdown of points awarded to North Macedonia in the second semi-final. Voting during the three shows involved each country awarding two sets of points from 1-8, 10 and 12: one from their professional jury and the other from televoting. The exact composition of the professional jury, and the results of each country's jury and televoting were released after the final; the individual results from each jury member were also released in an anonymised form. The Macedonian jury consisted of Agni Avshar, Andrijana Jovanovska, Ivan Petrovski, Nikola Micevski and Yon Idy. In the second semi-final, North Macedonia placed 11th with 76 points, just one spot from qualifying.

Points awarded to North Macedonia

Points awarded by North Macedonia

Detailed voting results
The following members comprised the Macedonian jury:
 Agni Avshar – singer-songwriter
 Andrijana Jovanovska – music producer, songwriter
 Ivan Petrovski – singer-songwriter
 Nikola Micevski – journalist, TV presenter
 Yon Idy – singer-songwriter, participated in Macedonian selection for Eurovision 2022

References 

2022
Countries in the Eurovision Song Contest 2022
Eurovision